The Canadian Men's Soccer Championship is an association football team contested in Canada. It is organised by CCAA and sponsored by Adidas.

Participants

 Seneca Sting
 Holland Hurricanes
 Mount Royal Cougars
 Douglas Royals
 Fx Garneau Elans
 Algonquin Thunder

Group stage

Group A

Group B

Matches

5th/6th place playoff

3rd/4th place playoff

Final

External links
 Official website

CCAA